Aleksandr "Andriy" Klimenko ( Oleksandr Klymenko, ; 27 March 1970 – 7 March 2000) was a Ukrainian shot putter.

Biography
Born in Kiev he is best known for his gold medal at the 1994 European Championships in Helsinki, which he achieved with a lifetime best throw of 20.78 meters.

Klimenko died in a shooting on 7 March 2000 in Kyiv, three weeks before his 30th birthday. He received four bullet wounds in the incident. Klimenko was working as a car salesman at the time of his death.

Over 300 athletes, coaches and friends attended the funeral.

International competitions

References

External links
 
 

1970 births
2000 deaths
Soviet male shot putters
Ukrainian male shot putters
Olympic athletes of the Unified Team
Athletes (track and field) at the 1992 Summer Olympics
Olympic athletes of Ukraine
Athletes (track and field) at the 1996 Summer Olympics
Sportspeople from Kyiv
World Athletics Championships medalists
World Athletics Championships athletes for the Soviet Union
World Athletics Championships athletes for Ukraine
European Athletics Championships medalists
Deaths by firearm in Ukraine
Universiade medalists in athletics (track and field)
Universiade gold medalists for the Soviet Union
Universiade gold medalists for Ukraine
Soviet Athletics Championships winners
Medalists at the 1991 Summer Universiade
Medalists at the 1993 Summer Universiade